, also known as  or  or , is a pidgin language that was spoken by West African soldiers and their white officers in the French colonial army approximately 1857–1954, and across certain French colonies. It consists of a simplified form of French.  It never creolized. This "simplified" language was taught to indigenous inhabitants in the French colonial army, and colonies, but is nowadays largely considered to be racist.

Background

The first West African soldiers were enrolled in the French colonial army in 1820 and the company of the Tirailleur Sénégalais was formed in 1857. They fought for France in both World Wars. The last company of West African soldiers in the French army was disbanded in 1964 and the last Tirailleur who served in WW1 died in 1998. It is important to keep in mind that while slavery was abolished in France and her colonies in 1848, this does not mean the situation changed totally overnight. There is an inter-departmental report from 1950 suggesting that the recruitment was not necessary voluntary from that point forward. The French military was to go "up-country to enroll captives, to whom the sum needed to purchase their freedom is given as enrollment bounty (Hargreaves, 1969: 100 as cited in Wilson). In other words, they more or less bought captives and turned them into soldiers.

The language of the West African soldiers in the French colonial army has been mentioned in descriptive works from the 19th century and forward. The earliest documented
utterances in Français Tirailleur are found in Dupratz (1864). Maurice Delafosse wrote about Français Tirailleur in 1904, describing it as a French equivalent to the more well-known English pidgins of the area.

The most cited source on the language variety is an anonymous manual, . The manual was printed in 1916 and was intended to facilitate the communication between French officers and the African
soldiers in the French army.

The manual is prescriptive, informing white officers how they should best formulate orders for optimal effect. The author(s) does make comments that suggest that the material is based on at least some actual experience with West African soldiers. There is also references to the structure of the Bambara language. This, together with the prescriptive nature of the work, suggests that the anonymous manual is the product of a conscious effort rather than natural utterances.

Chris Corne also wrote about this pidgin in his 1999 book on French contact languages

Potential substrates of Français Tirailleur

There are many languages that have been mentioned in connection with Français Tirailleur. First of all there is great consensus on the matter of the lexifier (the language that has contributed with most lexical items), it is French (as spoken in 1800s). The primary contact with the French language must have been through spoken discourse, which means that it is unlikely that structures and words that were uncommon in the spoken language at that time could have made it into the pidgin. There was a French officer by the name of Charles Mangin in the late 19th century and beginning of the 20th century who, in 1910, published a book called   in which he propagates for the use of African troops in the event of a European war. This book also contains valuable information about the African troops and their composition. The following is a summary of the information available in the book of Mangin.

Mangin writes that the first troops of African soldiers were mainly composed by the Wolofs and Toucouleurs (Fulani). Both the Wolofs and the Fulani speak languages of the North-Atlantic branch of the Niger-Congo family and are predominantly Muslim. The Fulani group is a large ethnic group in West Africa that has a wide geographical spread and many different dialects/languages. We cannot be sure what variety of the Fula was spoken by these West African soldiers.

Thus, the first troops were made up of speakers of Wolof and Fula. It is not unlikely that there were soldiers, speakers of Fula in particular, who had some knowledge of French prior to enrollment. After Wolof and Fula, the Serer (also Northern Atlantic; Niger-Congo) were added to the troops. At the time of publication of  the most dominating group was Mande (Bambara, Mandinka, Dyula, Soninke and Susu) and they were recruited after the Serer. The languages spoken by the Mande group are not related to the Niger-Congo. The Bambara and Mandinka were recruited first and later Susu and Dyula and lastly Soninke. The last group that Mangin notes that the French military recruited were the Hausa of Dahomey (modern day Northern Benin). The Wolof and Toucoulers (Fula) were preferred in the beginning according to Mangin because they were easier to incorporate in the military as there were already indigenous officers who spoke their languages (Wolof and Fula). The Bambara proved more difficult to instruct at first since they did not speak Wolof nor Fula, but they did later make up the largest group of the West African troops in the French colonial army.

The Hausa language is not related to Niger-Congo or the Mande languages, but a member of the Afro-Asiatic language family. This means that there were languages from
at least three separate language families spoken among the soldiers: Niger-Congo (Northern Atlantic), Mande and Afro-Asiatic (if we go by the classifications as made by glottolog ).

In popular culture
Speakers of this pidgin have been depicted in the biographical work of madame Cousturier  and in Ousmane Sembène's movie from 1987 Camp de Thiaroye.

Sample text

The European officers saw us as savages, even worse than dogs.

See also
French language
French West Africa
Tây Bồi Pidgin French

References

French-based pidgins and creoles
Languages attested from the 1850s
Languages extinct in the 1950s
French West Africa
Armée d'Afrique
Military pidgins
French language in Africa